Narayanpur is a hamlet in Jammu district in the union territory of Jammu and Kashmir, India. It is located less than a kilometer north of the India-Pakistan cease-fire line.

Notes

Villages in Jammu district